Vidal Marín Fernández (22 February 1653 – 10 March 1709) was a Spanish bishop who was Bishop of Ceuta from 1694, and later Grand Inquisitor of Spain in 1705, until his death in 1709.

Biography
Vidal Marín del Campo was born in Mora, Spain on 22 February 1653. He served as master of Santo Domingo de la Calzada and then as Inquisitor of Salamanca. On 13 September 1694, he was named the Bishop of Ceuta during the papacy of Pope Innocent XII. He was consecrated as bishop by Jaime de Palafox y Cardona on 19 December 1694. In 1705, Philip V of Spain named him Grand Inquisitor of Spain, the head of the Spanish Inquisition. He died on 10 March 1709, and was initially buried in Madrid. His remains were transferred to Ceuta in 1714.

References

1653 births
1709 deaths
Grand Inquisitors of Spain
17th-century Roman Catholic bishops in Africa
18th-century Roman Catholic bishops in Africa
History of Ceuta
Bishops of Ceuta